This is a list of current universities and colleges in Harbin, Heilongjiang, China.

See also
List of universities and colleges in Heilongjiang
List of universities in China

References
 

Harbin

Harbin